A list of football top division football teams in Tajikistan

CSKA Pomir Dushanbe
Energetik Dushanbe
FK Khujand
Guardia Dushanbe
Istiqlol Dushanbe
Khayr Vahdat FK
Parvoz Bobojon Ghafurov
Ravshan Kulob
Regar-TadAZ Tursunzoda
Vakhsh Qurghonteppa
Hosilot Farkhor
Zarafshon Pendjikent
FK Istaravshan

                                                                                                                                                                      

    
Tajikistan
Football clubs
Football clubs